"One Week" is a song by Canadian rock band Barenaked Ladies released as the first single from their 1998 album, Stunt. It was written by Ed Robertson, who is featured on the lead vocal of the rapped verses. Steven Page sings lead on the song's chorus, while the two co-lead the prechoruses in harmony. The song is notable for its significant number of pop culture references, and remains the band's best-known song in the United States, where it topped the Billboard Hot 100. Coincidentally, when the song reached  1 on the Billboard Hot 100, it remained in the top spot for one week.

In Canada, "One Week" reached No. 3 on the RPM Top Singles Chart, while worldwide, the song peaked within the top 10 of the charts in Iceland and the United Kingdom. The band has not equaled this level of US chart success since, though singles "It's All Been Done", from the same album, and "Pinch Me", from their subsequent album Maroon, both broke the top 50 of the US Hot 100. Apple used the song at MacWorld 1999 for presenting Mac OS X Server on a wall of 50 iMacs.

History
Ed Robertson wrote the ideas for the non-rap "choruses" with the concept being the structure of a fight between a man and a woman where the protagonist knows he is wrong and is just trying to save face. Robertson wanted to come up with a rapped verse for the song but all attempts failed. Bandmate Steven Page suggested he simply improvise the rap, as the two did onstage every night. Robertson heeded the advice and set up a video camera. He improvised the song at a slower pace to make rhyming easier and arrived at about four minutes of rap. He sent it to Page, who told him not to change a word. Two minutes of the improvising was almost directly compiled (with very little, if any, tweaking) into the verses of the song. Due to its improvised nature, the rapped sections are not intended to have any direct relation to the plot of the sung sections. The lyrics in the liner notes from Stunt contain some additional lines of rap that did not make it into the recorded version.

Band members have stated that the first live run-through of "One Week" did not go well and that it took some time to get the song to sound good live. The instrumental parts are played by band members, notably Ed Robertson on guitar, and Kevin Hearn sometimes on guitar and sometimes on keyboards; as well, while Hearn was away from touring shortly after the song's release, his place at shows was taken by one of two other musicians on keyboards who each added their own unique parts to the song, helping to shape its live sound early.

The song is rife with pop culture references, which include the following: Aquaman, Swiss Chalet, sushi and wasabi,  Busta Rhymes, LeAnn Rimes, Bert Kaempfert, The X-Files and its character, The Smoking Man, the film Frantic and its star Harrison Ford, Sting and tantric sex, Snickers, golf clubs, the film Vertigo, Akira Kurosawa and his film Seven Samurai, Sailor Moon, A Tribe Called Quest's song "Scenario", Birchmount Stadium and its annual Robbie International Soccer Tournament. Because of the song's pop culture references and fast-paced, nearly rapped vocals, it is similar in style to "Life Is a Rock (But the Radio Rolled Me)" by the band Reunion.

In performances starting in 2003, the band developed an acoustic, bluegrass version of the song. It is typically used in a new performance setting they developed on the Peepshow Tour that year, in which they play acoustically while they stand around and sing into one omni-directional microphone. With the departure of Steven Page in January 2009, Kevin Hearn has assumed lead vocal duties on most choruses. Hearn often sings the choruses together with drummer Tyler Stewart, who also performs the harmonies during the bridge. Both the third, last chorus and the following, ending part of the song are sung by Robertson, along with Stewart's harmonizing.

Critical reception
AllMusic's Liana Jonas called the song, "a well-crafted recording, which marries words that are funny and endearing with clever and bouncy music. Added kudos must be given to Robertson and co-frontman Steven Page for singing such a speedy mouthful without skipping a beat."

Music video
The music video was directed by McG and begins with the band performing the song in a royal court, featuring a singing girl on a wind-up pedestal (portrayed by Kiva Dawson), similar to a scene from the movie Chitty Chitty Bang Bang. During the interlude they make an escape and sing while driving a lookalike of The General Lee from The Dukes of Hazzard (using the numbers 07 instead of 01, minus the Confederate flag on the roof, and a 1968 rather than 1969 model year) and Starsky & Hutch's Ford Gran Torino. The band drives into a suburb, where they perform a concert in front of a 1950s bus, with a female motorcyclist, dressed like Evel Knievel, performing stunts. The video ends with a shot of the cyclist stuck on a tree. The video features Carmit Bachar from the Pussycat Dolls playing an angel.

Track listings

Canadian and US CD single, US cassette single
 "One Week" (remix) – 2:52
 "When You Dream" (home demo) – 4:22
 "Shoe Box" (live) – 2:54

US 7-inch single
A. "One Week" (remix) – 2:52
B. "When You Dream" (home demo) – 4:22

UK CD single
 "One Week" (remix) – 2:52
 "When You Dream" (home demo) – 5:19
 "Shoe Box" (live) – 2:56

UK cassette single
 "One Week" (remix) – 2:52
 "When You Dream" (home demo) – 5:19

Australian and Japanese CD EP
 "One Week" (remix)
 "The Old Apartment"
 "Brian Wilson" (live)
 "Be My Yoko Ono"
 "Alternative Girlfriend"

Australian remix CD single
 "One Week" (Dave's big beat remix) – 3:22
 "One Week" (Pull's Break remix) – 3:21
 "One Week" (original radio remix) – 2:52
 "One Week" (Dave's big beat extended remix) – 6:14

Personnel
 Ed Robertson – vocals, acoustic and electric guitars
 Steven Page – vocals
 Jim Creeggan – electric upright bass
 Kevin Hearn – keyboards, electric guitar
 Tyler Stewart – drums

Charts

Weekly charts

Year-end charts

Certifications

Release history

In popular culture
The song has been featured numerous times in other media, including the films Digimon: The Movie, American Pie, 10 Things I Hate About You, the band appear to perform it live in "College Kids", an early season 4 episode of The West Wing, the season 7 Oscar Special of On Cinema, an advertisement for Mitsubishi Motors,  a season 2 episode of Schooled, a season 4 episode of The Cleveland Show,  a season 3 episode of What We Do in the Shadows (TV series), the video game Alvin and the Chipmunks, and in the video game Rock Band Blitz. The song also appears as a recurring element of the mashup album Mouth Moods by US musician Neil Cicierega.

References

1998 singles
1998 songs
Barenaked Ladies songs
Rap rock songs
Billboard Hot 100 number-one singles
Juno Award for Single of the Year singles
List songs
Music videos directed by McG
Patter songs
Reprise Records singles
Songs written by Ed Robertson